Honkarakenne Oyj is a Finnish company that manufactures log homes. Honka is also a registered trademark of the company.

Honkarakenne’s factory is located in Karstula, Central Finland. By 2018, Honkarakenne had delivered about 85,000 log homes to more than 50 countries.

Honkarakenne has been a listed company since 1987. Its B-shares are now on the Small Cap list of the Helsinki Stock Exchange.

History

1958–1999
Honkarakenne’s roots go back to a company named Sahaus- ja Höyläysliike Veljekset Saarelainen, established in Hattuvaara, Lieksa, in 1958. Three brothers, Viljo, Arvo and Reino Saarelainen, originally had stakes in the company, which used an outdoor circular saw and planing machine. Their business idea was to develop the industrial production of log cabins, which was practically new to Finland at the time. They developed some machine tools, such as their round log machine, themselves.

The company's first prefabricated round-log villa, was introduced in 1963 and it launched its first villa collection in the same year. The cabins were prefabricated, but adaptable. In 1964, Nestori and Eino Saarelainen also joined the company, which was renamed Honkatuote Veljekset Saarelainen.

Eino Saarelainen became the company's sales representative for Southern Finland and a sales office was opened in Helsinki in 1965. The company's first exhibition house, next to Eino Saarelainen's detached house, was built in Tuusula in 1966. As sales increased, the company outgrew the production capacity of the Lieksa plant. Capital was raised for growth by expanding the company's ownership after which the brothers owned one third of Honkatuote Oy.

There were continuous conflicts between the brothers and Honkatuote’s main owners about the company's development needs. When cooperation became impossible, the Saarelainen brothers founded their own sales company, renamed Honkarakenne T. Saarelainen & Co. Ky. ‘T’ referred to their father, Tahvo, because they were wary of starting up a new business in their own names. Eino Saarelainen became CEO of the company. In 1967, Honkarakenne Ky was founded as the parent company, and Reino Saarelainen moved to Ikaalinen to plan the company's own round-log production. Reino and Nestori Saarelainen started production at Pohjois-Karjalan Honka Ky in 1967. They were granted a patent for their automated round-log production line.

Honkarakenne became a limited liability company in 1970. The Saarelainen brothers had no control over the innovative round-log manufacturing technology developed by Reino Saarelainen. Round logs were being produced in Ikaalinen, but the brothers believed in the future of the industrially manufactured round log. However, their financial situation prevented them from regaining control of Honkatuote, so they decided to redevelop round-log production from the beginning. In 1971, Honkarakenne expanded its production and sales network. Round-log production began in Central Finland in 1972 under the name of Karstulan Honka Oy, largely due to the interest shown by the municipality of Karstula. The factory had a good location in the middle of Finland's prime log forest, with the factory obtaining its raw materials from a reasonably nearby area. A Japanese export representative, Mr Fukuda, happened to be in Finland seeking suppliers of quality goods and visited the Tuusula exhibition area. This visit led to an agreement to deliver 250 houses to Japan. The Saarelainen brothers used the two million Finnish markka advance payment to buy back the majority of Honkatuote Oy's shares and merge the companies’ operations. Reino Saarelainen was elected CEO of Honkarakenne in 1976.

Honkarakenne was listed on the stock exchange in 1987.

In 1999 the company exported around 60% of its production and its main markets were Germany, Japan, France and the United States.

2000–

In 2000, Honkarakenne built the Suomi (Finland) house for Sydney’s oldest and most revered golf course at Concord, to mark the Sydney Olympic Games. This resting place after the ninth hole was around 500 square metres in size.

In 2006 Honkarakenne employed about 400 people, most of them working in Finland where the company had four factories. Honkarakenne also had a worldwide distribution channel and several sales offices abroad. Major exports of products went to France, Germany, Russia and Japan.

In 2013, the entire production of Honkarakenne was centralised in Karstula, where the company's main plant had been operating since 1971. The plant was given a major expansion in 2014.

Since 2015, Honkarakenne’s CEO has been Marko Saarelainen, a member of the founding family. He became CEO after leading a subsidiary, Honka Japan Inc., where he had served for almost 20 years.

In 2016, the company's registered office was transferred from Tuusula to Karstula. It had 110 employees in Karstula, around ten in the Helsinki area and the same number in various sales offices. Honkarakenne helped the Chinese authorities to establish log construction standards there. The company's main markets were Finland, Germany, France, Russia and Japan. A total of 49% of net sales came from exports.

In early 2017, the company announced that it would provide 34 log kindergartens around Finland for Pilke Daycare Centres. The value of the contract was EUR 6.9 million. In March, Honkarakenne organised a directed share issue, turning the Jyväskylä-based AKR Invest into a major stakeholder in the company.

By 2018, Honkarakenne had delivered about 85,000 log homes to more than 50 countries.

In 2019, Honkarakenne announced a deal with the Chinese Zhangjiakou Winter-Olympic Town Tourism Development Co. Ltd. The agreement concerned the provision of accommodation at the Haitou Valley resort, located near the 2022 Winter Olympics in Beijing. The forthcoming six buildings have a floor area of 2,000 square metres and will house hotel-style apartments.

In March 2022, Honkarakenne announced that it would suspend sales to Russia, its largest export market, due to the situation in Ukraine. The company had one importer in the country, but no other operations.

Organisation
The company's CEO is Marko Saarelainen, whose grandfather was Viljo Saarelainen, one of the company's founders. Honkarakenne's factory and logistics centre are located in Karstula.

Designers
Eero Saarelainen, the son of the eldest brother, Viljo Saarelainen, began designing log homes for the company in the 1960s. He designed around 50 in total, but was involved in designing hundreds of models, mainly alongside architect Kari Rainio. In 2020, Honkarakenne's Chief Architect is Anne Mäkinen. In addition to Mäkinen, Honkarakenne’s products are designed by windsurfing Olympic medallist and architect Tuuli Petäjä-Sirén. Prize-winning industrial designer, Harri Koskinen, designed Honkarakenne's Kontti collection of modern, small cabins, which were first exhibited at the Pori Housing Fair in 2018.

Products
Honkarakenne manufactures log homes, i.e. single-family houses, log cabins, log saunas and Honka Frame wooden houses. Honkarakenne also supplies larger public buildings such as clinics and daycare centres.

The non-settling log developed by the company makes installation easier by eliminating the need to account for settling of the log structure. The frame’s tightness, fast installation and maintenance-free nature are major advantages. Honkarakenne spends around 1% of its annual net sales on research and development.

The company has collaborated with VTT Technical Research Centre of Finland and  Tampere University of Technology. As an impartial body, VTT is responsible for quality control of log products on behalf of the entire company.

Markets

Honkarakenne's main market area is Finland. The company is the market leader in log-built leisure homes, but has also increased its sales of single-family houses since 2010.

Honkarakenne has representatives in almost every country in Central, Southern and Eastern Europe. By far its largest log buildings are ordered from Russia. Most builders are newly prosperous or wealthy companies, but recent customers also include well-to-do middle-class clients. Honka also has a number of extensive projects underway in Ukraine and Kazakhstan, including the main building at Mezhyhirya Residence, the home of former prime minister Viktor Yanukovych.  It also has significant net sales in the former CIS countries. Exports to the Far East are focused on Japan and South Korea, and the company has representatives in countries such as China and Mongolia. Individual projects have been implemented in countries as far away as Kenya.

Recognitions
Honkarakenne is the first log home supplier to be certified according to the international ISO 9001 quality and ISO 14001 environmental standards.
In 1998, Honkarakenne received the regional entrepreneur of the year award from the entrepreneur association of Central Finland. 
Honkarakenne received an Internationalisation Award from the President of the Republic of Finland in 1999.
A documentary telling the story of Honka, History of Honka, won the Corporate Image category at the WorldFest-Houston International Film Festival in 2019. The film was produced by Pohjantähti-Elokuva, directed by Pami Teirikari and edited by Altti Sjögren. The screenwriter was Anne-Maarit Sepling, Brand Communications Manager at Honkarakenne.

Literature
There are four books written about the company:
Hongan 50 vuosirengasta. Honkarakenteen historiaa 1958–2008. 2008. 
Heikki Turunen: Hongan tarina. Kertomus puusta, ihmisestä ja yrittäjyydestä. WSOY 2005. 
L. Peltola: Hirren hengessä. 30 v. Honkarakenne. Saarijärvi 1988, expanded edition 1993. 
Antti Kekola & Nelli Miettinen: Juuret ja syyt – 2018,

References

External links
 website

Companies listed on Nasdaq Helsinki
Manufacturing companies of Finland
Manufacturing companies established in 1958
1958 establishments in Finland